Mohamed Saïd Ouma is a film director and screenwriter who has been responsible for production and a programming assistant for the International African Film Festival of Africa and the Islands (FIFAI) in the city of Port à l'Ile in Réunion Island since 2004.
Before that he worked as a journalist in England for several years.
FIFAI is organized by Alain Gili and Mohamed Said Ouma.
The festival honors productions that are often ignored on the African continent, and also honors works made in the islands.

His 2007 documentary film Le Mythe de la cinquième île (The myth of the fifth island) explores how an immigrant from the Comoros islands adjusts to living in Coldharbour Lane in Brixton, London with men from Croatia and Sicily, girls from Spain and Norway.
The short sequel, Matso, épilogue du mythe de la cinquième île is a political documentary about illegal migration between the Comoros Island and Mayotte.

Filmography

References

Living people
People from Réunion
Film directors from Réunion
Year of birth missing (living people)